Silgonda rufipes is a species of beetle in the family Cerambycidae, and the only species in the genus Silgonda. It was described by Heller in 1924.

References

Mesosini
Beetles described in 1924